Jonathan Lloyd Walker (born 13 September 1967) is an English-Canadian film and television actor, producer and screenwriter who resides in Canada. He is known for film roles in Shooter, RED, and as the British radio operator Colin in The Thing (2011 prequel). He also played Rankol in the TV-series Flash Gordon.

Early life 
Jonathan Lloyd Walker was born in Henley on Thames, Oxfordshire, England and attended Shiplake C of E Primary School. When he was a toddler when his mother took him to auditions for commercials. He appeared in numerous school plays, several of which were choreographed by the mother of his school mate, actor Christian Bale.

Walker's parents divorced, and his mother married a Canadian. The family moved to Montreal, Quebec, Canada in the early 1980s. As well as school plays, he studied and performed with the Children's Theatre of Montreal and made appearances in short amateur films.

He attended the University of Western Ontario and studied Political Science. Also during this time he enlisted in the Canadian Armed Forces and successfully completed training as an infantry officer attached to the Royal Canadian Regiment. After completing his service Walker returned to acting after a brief stint writing and reading the news for CBC News Network in Toronto.

Career 
Walker performed in roles in the television film Volcano: Fire on the Mountain, the series Viper, and multiple appearances on the series The X-Files. Later he played more extensive roles such as Mark Twain in The Secret Adventures of Jules Verne and Jesus Christ in The Second Coming.
He has appeared in such films as Traitor, Shooter, Along Came a Spider and Land of the Dead. His long list of television credits includes The West Wing, Men in Trees, The Outer Limits and Smallville. He also played the leading role of Rankol in the Syfy Network series Flash Gordon.

In 2010 Walker has completed work in several feature films, most notably Red with Helen Mirren, Bruce Willis and Morgan Freeman. He plays the character Burbacher who is in charge of protecting the Vice-President from assassins.

In 2013 Walker voiced acted Billionaire & Entrepreneur Devin Westen, in GTA V.

Walker was also cast in Matthijs van Heijningen Jr.'s prequel to the 1982 John Carpenter classic The Thing. He portrayed the British character Colin who is the base radio operator. The film opened in 2011.

Family
Walker is married to award-winning documentary film-maker Sheona McDonald. They have three children.

Filmography

References

External links 
 

1967 births
Living people
English emigrants to Canada
English male film actors
English male television actors
Male actors from Oxfordshire
People from Henley-on-Thames